JWH-098 is a synthetic cannabinoid receptor agonist from the naphthoylindole family. It is the indole 2-methyl derivative of a closely related compound JWH-081, but has markedly different affinity for the CB1 and CB2 receptors. While JWH-081 is around ten fold selective for CB1 over CB2, in JWH-098 this is reversed, and it is around four times weaker than JWH-081 at CB1 while being six times more potent at CB2, giving it a slight selectivity for CB2 overall. This makes JWH-098 a good example of how methylation of the indole 2-position in the naphthoylindole series tends to increase CB2 affinity, but often at the expense of CB1 binding.

Legal status
In the United States, all CB1 receptor agonists of the 3-(1-naphthoyl)indole class such as JWH-098 are Schedule I Controlled Substances.

JWH-098 is illegal in Russia, Sweden, and the UK, although it is unclear whether it has any history of human use.

See also 
 JWH-007
 JWH-081

References 

JWH cannabinoids
Naphthoylindoles
Phenol ethers
Designer drugs
CB1 receptor agonists
CB2 receptor agonists